Hockey Club Dinamo Minsk (Dynama-Minsk) is an ice hockey team based in Minsk, Belarus. They are members of the Tarasov Division of the Kontinental Hockey League.

Dinamo has qualified for the KHL playoffs (Gagarin Cup) four times: in the 2010–11, 2011–12, 2014–15 and 2016–17 KHL seasons. The team has not won a single round in the Gagarin Cup playoffs, losing in all four series.

History
Dinamo was founded in 2003, taking the name of the Minsk club Dinamo, and won the Belarusian Extraleague championship title once and the Belarus Cup twice.

On 26 March 26, 2008, the KHL confirmed the Belarusian club's inclusion in the Bobrov Division. Dinamo Minsk started to play on the ice of Minsk Palace of Sports and was relocated to the newly built Minsk-Arena in December 2009. The first head coach of the club was Paul Gardner, however he was dismissed prior to the beginning of the season. The next head coach became Jim Hughes, a protégé of previous Belarus national team head coach Curt Fraser. But after the first twelve games, the team was ranked next to the last place and Jim Hughes was dismissed. The new vacancy was taken by Russian specialist Vasili Spiridonov whose efforts were not enough to raise Dinamo Minsk from the bottom of the tournament table. The club ended the season ranked 22nd out of 24 teams.

The next season team began under command of Glen Hanlon, who brought the Belarus national team to the sixth place at WC2006 in Riga. The team roster was filled with world-famous players Ville Peltonen and Ossi Väänänen, and also one of the best Belarusian goaltenders Andrei Mezin. The 2009–10 season was similar to the previous one. The team did not show good result and Glen Hanlon was substituted by the head coach of HK Homiel. Dinamo Minsk finished at the 17th spot in the KHL while missing the playoffs, but still managed to win Spengler Cup under the guidance of Alexander Andrievsky.

The 2010–11 season was Dinamo Minsk's best season in the KHL. Marek Sýkora, who is widely thought of as one of the best coaches in the KHL, was appointed head coach. He brought Metallurg Magnitogorsk to the final games in 2005 and a rookie of the KHL Avtomobilist to the KHL playoffs in 2010. Dinamo Minsk under his command managed not only to get into the playoffs but was byt one step removed from the Western Conference semi-finals when Lokomotiv prevailed in the decisive game seven of the series.

The 2011–12 season of Dinamo Minsk was to have begun on 8 September 2011, versus Lokomotiv Yaroslavl. However, on 7 September 2011, the plane carrying the Lokomotiv team to the game in Minsk had crashed during takeoff, killing all but one of Lokomotiv's roster. Four days later, a memorial ceremony took place at the Minsk-Arena, with Minsk players paying tribute to the victims.

In the 2016–17 season, the assistant coach of the Belarus national team Craig Woodcroft, became the head coach of Dinamo Minsk. From the very beginning to the end of the regular season, the "Bisons" were in the playoff zone and breaking a number of club records. They first collected 105 points in a regular season and took eighth place in the general standings of the KHL. But in the playoffs, Dinamo did not succeed. Again, as six years ago, Lokomotiv Yaroslavl became the rival at the first stage. The series ended in five games - 1-4. Also during the season, in December 2016, Dinamo for the second time took part in the Spengler Cup.

Woodcroft had a three-year contract, but elected to leave the team in spring to head the Swiss club Geneva-Servette. Gordie Dwyer was appointed head coach for the 2017–18 season. The roster had to be formed taking into account the financial difficulties that arose at the end of the previous season, so the team was weakened. Leaders like Ben Scrivens, Kevin Lalande, Raman Hrabarenka, Matt Ellison, Rob Klinkhammer, Sergei Kostitsyn, Andrei Stas and Nikita Komarov left. Instead of these players came mainly young Belarusians and four hockey players who had not previously played in the KHL - Jhonas Enroth, Quinton Howden, Justin Fontaine and Jack Skille. Some of them showed great performance: Enroth joined the Sweden national team to participate in the Olympics in Pyeongchang and became the best player of the season in the opinion of the fans, and Howden took the second place in the list of the team's top scorers. But in general, the season for Dinamo was unsuccessful: the team finished in the 10th place in the conference and did not qualify for the playoffs.

Arenas
Dinamo Minsk called Minsk Sports Palace as their home until they moved to the new Minsk-Arena in 2010.

Season-by-season KHL record
Note: GP = Games played, W = Wins, OTW = Overtime/shootout wins, L = Losses,  OTL = Overtime/shootout losses, GF = Goals for, GA = Goals against, Pts = Points

Players

Current roster

Franchise records and scoring leaders

KHL scoring leaders

These are the top-ten point-scorers in franchise history while being a KHL club. Figures are updated after each completed KHL regular season.

Note: Pos = Position; GP = Games played; G = Goals; A = Assists; Pts = Points; P/G = Points per game;  = current Dinamo Minsk player Franchise records 

 Regular season 
Most goals in a season: Geoff Platt, 26 (2009–10) & (2015–16)
Most assists in a season: Charles Linglet, 36 (2014–15)
Most points in a season: Charles Linglet, 58 (2014–15)
Most penalty minutes in a season: Duvie Westcott, 146 (2009–10)
Most points in a season, defenseman: Brennan Menell, 38 (2020–21)
Most points in a game: Jonathan Cheechoo, 5 (vs. Jokerit, September 4, 2014, 3 goals and 2 assists)
Most powerplay goals in a season: Geoff Platt, (2009–10), Jonathan Cheechoo, (2014-15) - tied with 10 
Most shorthanded goals in a season: Ilya Dokshin (2008–09), Geoff Platt (2009–10), Alexander Kulakov (2010–11), Zbyněk Irgl (2011–12), Andrei Stas (2011–12), Zbyněk Irgl (2013–14), Matt Ellison (2014–15), Jonathan Cheechoo (2014-15) - all tied with 2
Most wins in a season: Kevin Lalande, 16 (2011–12)
Most shutouts in a season: Kevin Lalande, 4 (2011–12)
Highest plus-minus in a season: Libor Pivko - +18 (2011–12)

 Playoffs 
Most goals in a playoff season: Geoff Platt, 4 (2010–11)
Most assists in a playoff season: Peter Podhradský, 6 (2010–11)
Most points in a playoff season: Peter Podhradský, 8 (2010–11)
Most penalty minutes in a playoff season: Jordan Henry, 33 (2010–11)
Most points in a playoff season, defenseman: Peter Podhradský, 8 (2010–11)
Most points in a game, playoff: 3, shared by 5 players

 Hat-tricks 
 Dmitry Meleshko, 11-21-2010 at Metallurg Magnitogorsk - needed 43.26 to complete the feat
 Zbyněk Irgl, 11-22-2011 at Barys Astana - needed 31.48 to complete the feat
 Jonathan Cheechoo, 09-04-2014 at Jokerit - needed 42.54 to complete the feat
 Jonathan Cheechoo, 10-24-2014 at Yugra Khanty-Mansiysk - needed 26.09 to complete the feat
 Matt Ellison, 10-03-2015 at Avangard Omsk - needed 17.05 to complete the feat
 Matt Ellison, 10-05-2015 at Barys Astana - needed 21.45 to complete the feat
 Rob Klinkhammer, 10-23-2016 at Sochi - needed 39.52 to complete the feat
 Quinton Howden, 10-02-2017 at Dinamo Moscow - needed 43.45 to complete the feat

Honours

Champions
 Belarus
Belarusian Extraleague (5): 1993–94, 1994–95, 1995–96, 1999–2000, 2006–07
Belarus Cup (3): 2005, 2006, 2009

 BSSR
BSSR League (2): 1967–68, 1969–70

 Europe
Spengler Cup (1): 2009

 Belarus
Memorial Salei: (1)'': 2014

Runners-up
Belarusian Extraleague (3):  1996, 1996–97, 2005–06
BSSR League (1): 1968–69
Nadezhda Cup (KHL) (1): 2013–14

References

External links
  

 
Ice hockey teams in Belarus
Kontinental Hockey League teams
Sport in Minsk
2003 establishments in Belarus
Bobrov Division (KHL)